Ronny Van Holen (born 9 March 1959) is a Belgian former racing cyclist. He rode in eight Grand Tours between 1981 and 1989.

Major results

1977
 1st  Road race, UCI Junior Road World Championships
1978
 3rd Circuit de Wallonie
1979
 1st 
 2nd Overall Tour de Liège
 2nd Ronde van Vlaanderen Beloften
 8th Overall GP Tell
1st Stages 4 & 8
1980
 1st 
 1st Stage 4 Flèche du Sud
1981
 2nd Schaal Sels
 7th Omloop van de Vlaamse Scheldeboorden
1982
 1st Grand Prix Cerami
 3rd Brabantse Pijl
 3rd GP de Denain
 4th Polder-Kempen
 5th Clásica de San Sebastián
 6th Overall Deutschland Tour
 7th Overall Vuelta a Aragón
 7th Circuit des Frontières
 9th GP du canton d'Argovie
1983
 2nd Grote Prijs Jef Scherens
 7th GP du canton d'Argovie
 8th Grand Prix de Wallonie
 9th Ronde van Limburg
1984
 1st Brabantse Pijl
 1st Grote Prijs Jef Scherens
 1st Stage 7b Volta a Catalunya
 1st Stage 5 Setmana Catalana de Ciclisme
 2nd Druivenkoers-Overijse
 3rd Overall Tour of Belgium
 7th Scheldeprijs
1985
 1st Le Samyn
 3rd Grand Prix Cerami
 5th Grote Prijs Jef Scherens
 6th GP de Fourmies
1986
 1st Binche–Tournai–Binche
 3rd Amstel Gold Race
 3rd Nokere Koerse
 4th Road race, National Road Championships
 4th Kampioenschap van Vlaanderen
 5th Tour of Flanders
1987
 1st Grote Prijs Jef Scherens
 3rd Omloop van de Westhoek
 4th Road race, National Road Championships
 7th Tour of Flanders
1988
 1st Omloop Het Volk
 5th De Kustpijl
 7th GP de Fourmies
1989
 9th Brabantse Pijl
1990
 3rd Tour de Vendée
1991
 1st Druivenkoers-Overijse
 8th Grand Prix Impanis-Van Petegem
1992
 5th Kampioenschap van Vlaanderen

References

External links

1959 births
Living people
Belgian male cyclists
Sportspeople from Aalst, Belgium
Cyclists from East Flanders